Thomas Allen "Corky" Tharp (April 19, 1931 – April 3, 2003) was an American football defensive back who played one season for the New York Titans of the American Football League. He also played for the Canadian Argonauts. He played college football at the University of Alabama for the Alabama Crimson Tide football team.

See also
 Alabama Crimson Tide football yearly statistical leaders

References

1931 births
2003 deaths
American football defensive backs
New York Titans (AFL) players
Alabama Crimson Tide football players
Players of American football from Birmingham, Alabama